This is a list of slave cabins and other notable slave quarters. A number of slave quarters in the United States are individually listed on the National Register of Historic Places. Many more are included as contributing buildings within listings having more substantial plantation houses or other structures as the main contributing resources in a historic district or other listing.

In fiction and non-fiction
Uncle Tom's Cabin
Aunt Phillis's Cabin
The Little Old Log Cabin in the Lane
Kindred (novel) realistic depictions
Thomas Jefferson Slave Apartments, a band
Life at the South; or, "Uncle Tom's Cabin" as It Is
Tara (plantation), Georgia, of the novel Gone with the Wind
Casa-Grande & Senzala, Brazil book 
Uncle Tom's Cabin  novel

Caribbean
Wallblake House, Anguilla

Netherlands Antilles
Bonaire, Netherlands antilles, pics

Puerto Rico
Hacienda Buena Vista, Ponce, Puerto Rico
Hacienda Santa Rita, Puerto Rico

Cuba
Valle de los Ingenios, Cuba, with pic

South Africa
Leeuwenhof, South Africa

Canada
Uncle Tom's Cabin Historic Site, Ontario, Canada

United States

Alabama
Rosemount (Forkland, Alabama)
Boxwood Plantation Slave Quarter, Courtland, AL, NRHP-listed
Dudley Snow House, Alabama
Faunsdale Plantation, Alabama
Glencairn (Greensboro, Alabama)
Magnolia Grove (Greensboro, Alabama)
First National Bank (Huntsville, Alabama)
Boxwood Plantation Slave Quarter, Alabama

Arkansas
Jackson House (Fayetteville, Arkansas)

Connecticut
Captain David Judson House, Connecticut

Delaware
Gov. William H. Ross House, a historic plantation near Seaford in Sussex County, Delaware, has Delaware's only documented, surviving slave quarters

Florida
Erwin House (Greenwood, Florida)
Bellevue Plantation, Florida
Kingsley Plantation, Florida
Pine Hill Plantation, Florida
Fort George Island Cultural State Park, Florida
Gamble Plantation Historic State Park, Florida

Georgia
Uncle Remus Museum, Eatonton, Georgia, Putnam County, Georgia, includes a log cabin created from two slave cabins.  The museum is dedicated to portraying Southern life as in the Uncle Remus stories.
Anderson House (Danburg, Georgia)
Westover (Milledgeville, Georgia)
St. Simons, Georgia
Liberty Hall (Crawfordville, Georgia)
Telfair Museums, Savannah, Georgia
Callaway Plantation, Georgia
Bonar Hall, Georgia
Hamilton Plantation Slave Cabins, St. Simons Island, GA, NRHP-listed
Travelers Rest (Toccoa, Georgia)
Gascoigne Bluff
Golden Isles of Georgia
Hofwyl-Broadfield Plantation, Georgia
List of plantations in Georgia (U.S. state)
Seclusaval and Windsor Spring, Georgia
Archibald Smith Plantation Home, Georgia
Stafford Plantation, Georgia
Stone Mountain, Georgia
Chief Vann House Historic Site, Georgia
Owens–Thomas House, Savannah, Georgia, whose slave quarter's ceiling was painted haint blue

Kentucky
Beechland (Jeffersontown, Kentucky)
George W. Johnson Slave Quarters and Smokehouse, Georgetown, KY, NRHP-listed
McConnell House, Law Office, and Slave Quarters, Wurtland, KY, NRHP-listed
Garrard County, Kentucky
McConnell House, Law Office, and Slave Quarters (redlink), NRHP-listed, Wurtland, Kentucky
Carneal House, Kentucky
Liberty Hall (Frankfort, Kentucky)
List of plantations in Kentucky (U.S. state)
Royal Spring Park, Kentucky
Sherman Tavern, Kentucky
Thomas Huey Farm, Kentucky
Traveler's Rest, NRHP-listed, Lincoln County, Kentucky
Waveland State Historic Site, Kentucky
Kimbrough-Hehr House, Kentucky

Louisiana
Evergreen Plantation (Wallace, Louisiana)
Magnolia Plantation (Derry, Louisiana)
Riverlake, around 8 miles south of New Roads
Louisiana African American Heritage Trail
Oakland Plantation (Natchitoches, Louisiana)
New Orleans African American Museum
Ashland Plantation, in Darrow
Audubon State Historic Site, Louisiana
Evan Hall, in Donaldsonville
LSU Rural Life Museum in Baton Rouge
Evan Hall Slave Cabins, in Donaldsonville, NRHP-listed
Gallier House, New Orleans
Madame John's Legacy, New Orleans, Louisiana
Hermann–Grima House, New Orleans, Louisiana
Hayes, Louisiana
Kent Plantation House, Alexandria
Laura Plantation, near Vacherie
Magnolia Mound Plantation House, in Baton Rouge
Tally-Ho Plantation House, Bayou Goula
Laurel Valley Sugar Plantation, Thibodaux
Hotel Maison De Ville, New Oeleans, Louisiana
Whitney Plantation Historic District, near Wallace
Nottoway Plantation, near White Castle
Uncle Sam Plantation, near Convent
LaBranche Plantation Dependency, in St. Rose
Felicity Plantation, in Vacherie

Maryland
Spring Hill Farm (Ellicott City, Maryland)
Belvoir (Crownsville, Maryland)
Bon Air Manor (Ellicott City, Maryland)
Sotterley (Hollywood, Maryland)
National Harbor, Maryland
Northampton Plantation, Bowie, Maryland
The Willows (Cavetown, Maryland)
Bloomsbury (Frederick, Maryland)
Woodlawn (Columbia, Maryland)
The Oaks (Ellicott City, Maryland),  demolished
Hampton National Historic Site, Maryland
Round About Hills, Maryland
Susanna Farm, Maryland
L'Hermitage Slave Village Archeological Site, Frederick, MD, NRHP-listed
MacAlpine, Maryland
McPherson's Purchase, Maryland
Arlington (Columbia, Maryland)
Beall–Dawson House, Maryland
Cedar Park (Galesville, Maryland)
Bunker Hill (Millersville, Maryland)
Seneca Historic District (Poolesville, Maryland)
List of Howard County properties in the Maryland Historical Trust
Waverly (Marriottsville, Maryland)
Friendship Valley Farm, Maryland
Gray Rock (Ellicott City, Maryland)
Montgomery County, Maryland
Riley-Bolten House, Maryland
Sarah Jane Powell Log Cabin, Maryland
Clark's Elioak Farm, Maryland
Oakdale Manor, Maryland
Cherry Grove, HO-1, Maryland
Hockley Forge and Mill, Maryland
Cornehill, Maryland
River Hill Farm, Maryland
La Veille, Maryland
Dowden's Luck, Maryland
Woburn Manor, Maryland
John Due House, Maryland
Hoffman Farm, Maryland

Massachusetts
Isaac Royall House, with only surviving slave quarters in Massachusetts

Mississippi
Monmouth (Natchez, Mississippi)
Canemount Plantation, Mississippi
Reuben Davis House, Mississippi
Rosswood, Mississippi
Green Leaves, Mississippi
Natchez National Historical Park, Mississippi

Missouri
New Bourbon, Missouri
Jacques Guibourd Historic House, Missouri
Alfred W. Morrison House, Missouri
Rice-Tremonti House, Missouri
The Griot Museum of Black History, Missouri
Newbill-McElhiney House, Missouri
Shobe-Morrison House, Missouri

New Hampshire
John Sullivan House, New Hampshire

New York
Bush-Lyon Homestead, New York
Raynham Hall Museum, New York

North Carolina
Horton Grove, only 2-story slave quarters in North Carolina
Cascine (Louisburg, North Carolina)
Bellamy Mansion, North Carolina
Boyette Slave House, Kenly	NC, NRHP-listed
Bowen-Jordan Farm, North Carolina
Tryon, North Carolina
James Newsome House, North Carolina
Poteat House, North Carolina
Mills-Screven Plantation, North Carolina
Somerset Place, North Carolina
Stagville, North Carolina
Midway Plantation House and Outbuildings, North Carolina
Pettigrew State Park, North Carolina
Brown–Graves House and Brown's Store, North Carolina
Fairntosh Plantation, North Carolina
Leigh Farm, North Carolina
Grimesland Plantation, North Carolina
Waddle–Click Farm, North Carolina
Zebulon B. Vance Birthplace, North, Carolina

Pennsylvania
President's House (Philadelphia)

South Carolina
Point of Pines Plantation Slave Cabin, Edisto Island, SC, NRHP-listed
Slave Houses, Gregg Plantation, Mars Bluff, South Carolina, NRHP-listed
Annandale Plantation (Georgetown County, South Carolina)
Fox House (Lexington, South Carolina)
Oakwood (Gadsden, South Carolina)
Old House Plantation, South Carolina
Boone Hall, South Carolina
Brookland Plantation, South Carolina
Drayton Hall, South Carolina
Miles Brewton House, South Carolina
Laurelwood (Richland County, South Carolina) 
Hopsewee, HABS photos, South Carolina
Magnolia (Bennettsville, South Carolina)
Pee Dee River Rice Planters Historic District, South Carolina
Goodwill Plantation, South Carolina
Harrietta Plantation, South Carolina
Herndon Terrace, South Carolina
Hightower Hall, South Carolina
Hobcaw Barony, South Carolina
Keithfield Plantation, South Carolina
List of plantations in South Carolina
Mansfield Plantation, South Carolina
McLeod Plantation, South Carolina
Sams Plantation Complex Tabby Ruins, South Carolina
Wicklow Hall Plantation, South Carolina
Nathaniel Russell House, South Carolina
Evins-Bivings House, South Carolina
Frederick Nance House, South Carolina
Nicholls-Crook House, South Carolina

Tennessee
The Hermitage (Nashville, Tennessee)
Owen-Primm House, Tennessee ... see Primm Farm slave cabins preservation here
White Plains (Cookeville, Tennessee)
Rock Castle (Hendersonville, Tennessee)
Belle Meade Plantation, Tennessee
Carnton, Tennessee
Clover Bottom Mansion, Tennessee
DeVault Tavern, Tennessee
Edwards-Fowler House, Tennessee
Ewing Farm, Tennessee
Clifton Place (Columbia, Tennessee)
Mabry Hood House, Tennessee
L'Hermitage Slave Village Archeological Site, Tennessee
Museum of Appalachia, Tennessee
Rice-Marler House, Tennessee
Maden Hall Farm, Tennessee
Williams–Richards House, Tennessee
Samuel Stacker House, non-contributing, Tennessee

Texas
Washington-on-the-Brazos, Texas
Sweeny, Texas

Virginia
Arcola Slave Quarters, Arcola, Virginia, NRHP-listed
Dover Slave Quarter Complex, Manakin-Sabot, VA, NRHP-listed
Piedmont (Greenwood, Virginia)
Highland (James Monroe house)
Ionia (Trevilians, Virginia)
Mannheim (Linville, Virginia)
Meadow Grove Farm, Virginia
Montpelier (Orange, Virginia)
Mount Vernon, Virginia, see Quander family
Green Hill (Long Island, Virginia)
Berry Hill Plantation, Virginia
Appomattox Court House National Historical Park ruins
Ben Venue (Washington, Virginia)
Black Walnut (Clover, Virginia)
Bel Air (Woodbridge, Virginia)
Ramsay (Greenwood, Virginia)
Solitude (Blacksburg, Virginia)
Stirling (Massaponax, Virginia)
Westview (Brookneal, Virginia)
Red Hill Patrick Henry National Memorial, Virginia
Edge Hill (Gladstone, Virginia)
Rose Hill Farm (Upperville, Virginia)
Farnley (White Post, Virginia)
Dewberry (Beaverdam, Virginia)
Brickland ruins, Virginia
Mountain Home (Front Royal, Virginia)
Pharsalia (Tyro, Virginia)
Sunnyside (Washington, Virginia)
Waveland (Marshall, Virginia)
Thomas Jefferson Foundation
Loretto (Wytheville, Virginia)
Martin's Hundred, virginia
Monticello
Oakley Farm (Virginia)
Clark Royster House, Clarksville, Virginia
Edmondson Hall, Virginia
St. Julien (Spotsylvania County, Virginia)
McLean House (Appomattox, Virginia)
Monocacy National Battlefield
Long Branch Plantation, Virginia
Effingham (Aden, Virginia)
Westend (Trevilians, Virginia), HABS pics
The Cove (Harrisburg, Virginia)
Estouteville (Esmont, Virginia)
Tuckahoe (plantation), Virginia
Rose Hill (Front Royal, Virginia)
Keswick (Powhatan, Virginia) circular Virginia
Locust Hill (Mechanicsville, Virginia)
Spring Hill (Ivy, Virginia)
The Farm (Rocky Mount, Virginia)
Arlington House, The Robert E. Lee Memorial
Annefield (Boyce, Virginia)
Carter's Grove, Virginia
Fudge House, Virginia
Poplar Forest, Virginia
Sweet Briar College, Virginia
Patrick Robert Sydnor Log Cabin, Virginia
Clover Hill Tavern, Virginia
Glennmary, Virginia
Thomas Jefferson and slavery
Buffalo Forge, Virginia
Black Meadow, Virginia
Long Glade Farm, Virginia
Collins Ferry Historic District, Virginia
Mount Bernard Complex, Virginia
Chatham Manor, Virginia
Smithfield Farm, Virginia
Prestwould, Virginia
Howard's Neck Plantation, Virginia
Ben Lomond Plantation, Virginia
Rockbridge Alum Springs Historic District, Virginia
Mount Fair, Virginia
Cyrus McCormick Farm, Virginia
Farmer's Rest, Virginia
Woodlawn Historic and Archeological District, Virginia
Glendale Farm, Virginia
Blandy Experimental Farm Historic District, Virginia

Washington, D.C.
Decatur House, Washington, D.C.
The Octagon House, Washington, D.C.
Belmont-Paul Women's Equality National Monument, Washington, D.C.

West Virginia
Edgewood (Bunker Hill, West Virginia)
Hedges–Robinson–Myers House, Hedgesville, West Virginia
Teter Myers French House, West Virginia
William Wilson House (Gerrardstown, West Virginia)
Altona (West Virginia)
Maidstone Manor Farm, West Virginia
Carter Farm, West Virginia
John Drinker House, West Virginia

Items with relevant info to capture
Antebellum architecture
Booker T. Washington National Monument, Virginia
Charles H. Fairbanks
Josiah Henson
Plantation complexes in the Southern United States
Plantations in the American South
James Innes Thornton

Other slave-related buildings
Bremo Slave Chapel, Bremo Bluff, VA, NRHP-listed
Bruin's Slave Jail, Alexandria, VA, NRHP-listed
Old Slave Mart, Charleston, SC, NRHP-listed
Mason County, Kentucky slave pen
Various slave forts in Africa

See also
List of African-American historic places in Georgia

References